The 2005 Richmond Kickers season was the club's thirteenth season in existence. The club played in the USL First Division, which represented the second-tier of American soccer.

Playing in the second tier of American soccer for the past nine seasons, this season was the Kickers' final season of playing in the second tier until 2017, as the club self-relegated themselves starting the following season. The reasons primarily emphasized financial stability, stating that the club would be more profitable in the third division rather than the second.

Background 

The Kickers came off a successful 2004 campaign that saw the club finish second in the A-League Eastern Division. Amassing a total of 17 wins, eight losses and three draws, the Kickers posted 54 points that season, having the third strongest overall record in the league, behind Portland Timbers and Montreal Impact. The former VCU standout, McColm Cephas lead the team in scoring during the 2004 season, tallying 10 goals.

Review

Competitions

USL First Division

Standings

Results summary

Results by round

Game reports 

Source

USL Playoffs

First round

Semifinals

Championship

U.S. Open Cup

Statistics

Transfers

See also 

 Richmond Kickers
 List of Richmond Kickers seasons
 2005 United Soccer Leagues
 2005 U.S. Open Cup
 2005 in American soccer

References 

Richmond Kickers
2005
2005 in sports in Virginia